The 2022 WAFF U-16 Championship was the 9th edition of the WAFF U-16 Championship, the annual international youth football championship organised by the WAFF for the men's under-16 national teams of West Asia. It took place in Aqaba, Jordan, at the Aqaba Stadium. Eight teams played in the competition, with players born on or after 1 January 2006 eligible to participate.

Yemen, who won the previous edition in 2021, were the title holders; they were eliminated in the group stage. Hosts Jordan won the competition for the first time, after defeating Lebanon 1–0 in the final.

Participating nations 
Eight nations from the WAFF participated in the tournament; Bahrain, Qatar, Saudi Arabia and the United Arab Emirates did not take part. The draw for the group stage was held on 25 May 2022 at the WAFF headquarters in Jordan.

Group stage 
The group winners and runners-up advanced to the semi-finals.

Group A

Group B

Knockout stage

Semi-finals

Final

Player awards
The following awards were given at the conclusion of the tournament:

Goalscorers

References 

WAFF Championship tournaments
WAFF
International association football competitions hosted by Jordan